Federal Hill is a neighborhood in Providence, Rhode Island. It lies immediately west of the city's Downtown, across Interstate 95. Since the late 19th century, Federal Hill has been an enclave of Providence's Italian American community; today the neighborhood is known as Providence's Little Italy and is noted for its abundance of Italian restaurants, markets, and cultural establishments.

Geography 
Federal Hill is bounded by Westminster Street to the south, Route 6 and Route 10 to the west and north, and Interstate 95 to the east. The area borders Downtown to the east, Smith Hill and Valley to the north, Olneyville to the west, and the West End and South Providence to the south.

Atwells Avenue is the cultural centerpiece of the neighborhood, with many famous restaurants densely clustered along it between Interstate 95 and Harris Avenue. It also contains a mix of other typical urban businesses such as sandwich and pizza shops, convenience stores, a hotel, and tattoo parlors.

The gateway arch over Atwells Avenue near Downtown is one of the most recognizable landmarks in Providence. The La Pigna (or The Pine Cone) sculpture hanging from its center — a traditional Italian symbol of welcome, abundance, and quality — is often mistakenly referred to as "The Pineapple" and has become the symbol of Federal Hill. Other important streets in the neighborhood include Broadway, home to restaurants as well as professional, medical and legal offices, but also to the historic Columbus Theater now used for movies and live performances. Other than a commercial and warehouse section in the area of Dean and Washington Streets, most of the rest of the neighborhood is residential, often catering to college students. Johnson and Wales University maintains the Renaissance Hall dormitory on Federal Hill as well.

Most cross streets in the historic neighborhood between Atwells Avenue and Broadway are one-way due to their narrowness. A few streets remain paved with cobblestone.

DePasquale Plaza and fountain

DePasquale Plaza, sometimes referred to as "the heart of the neighborhood," is a popular spot for outdoor dining and people-watching. The plaza features a central grand fountain surrounded by restaurants and outdoor dining. In the summer of 2018 the plaza's "famous" fountain was in a state of partial disrepair, with only two levels flowing and the base filled with plants. In April 2019 the fountain was struck by an automobile and became only partially working. The fountain was completely restored at a cost of about $500,000 in July 2020.

History
Federal Hill received its name after a 1788 Fourth of July ox roast celebration on the plain adjacent to the hill. The organizers of the celebration intended to celebrate the ratification of the Federal Constitution by the 9 of the 13 states needed to create the United States. Because anti-federalist sentiment was strong in Rhode Island, General William West led 1,000 armed farmers to Providence to stop the celebration. Eventually, a compromise was reached and the celebrants agreed to celebrate Independence Day only and not the ratification of the Federal Constitution. The issue remained hotly controversial in Rhode Island for two more years until the state finally became the last of the original thirteen states to join the union.

The area of Federal Hill was originally called Nocabulabet, believed to be an anglicized version of either a Narragansett or Wampanoag phrase meaning "land above the river" or "land between the ancient waters".

Federal Hill's Atwells Avenue is named for Amos Maine Atwell, who led a syndicate of businessmen developing the western areas of the city in 1788. The area developed into a working class area during the early 19th century in part due to reverses in commercial shipping.

In 1840, only the lower streets of the hill were occupied, and that mostly by Irish immigrants who worked in the nearby textile shops and foundries. Yet, by the early 1850s, the part of Atwells Avenue that we think of today as "Little Italy" was clustered with two and three story tenements that housed the large influx of those who fled the famine of 1845 to 1851. A third of these people came from the Barony of Truagh and surrounding townlands. This area, encompassing Northern County Monaghan and Southern County Tyrone, had for centuries been the fiefdom of the McKenna clan. Not incidentally, McKenna was, by far, the most common name on Federal Hill in the 1860s.

The 1870s saw the first arrival of immigrants from southern Italy, with greater numbers arriving in the next two decades. By 1895, the Hill was divided almost evenly between Irish and Italians. These were tension-filled times, as both groups fought for jobs and respect from the Yankee majority.

The first two decades of the 20th century witnessed heavy Italian-American immigration into Federal Hill, making it the city's informal Little Italy. Though the area today is  more diverse, Federal Hill still retains its status as the traditional center for the city's Italian-American community. Providence's annual Columbus Day parade marches down Atwells Avenue, where the street's median is painted with the Italian flag's Tri-color instead of the usual double yellow lines.

In 1954, Raymond Loreda Salvatore Patriarca Sr, the newly appointed boss of the New England Faction of La Cosa Nostra (Now known as the Patriarca Crime Family), made drastic changes to the family, the biggest being moving the family's base of operations from Boston to Atwells Ave in Federal Hill. He ran the crime family from 1954 until 1984 from the National Cigarette Service Company and Coin-O-Matic Distributors, a vending machine and pinball business on Atwells Avenue. The business was known to family members as "The Office".

Demographics

According to the 2000 census, the racial makeup of the 02903 zip code, in which Federal Hill is located, was 65.8% White, 12.4% Black or African American, 7.2% Asian, 0.7% American Indian, and 8.4% from other races. Hispanic or Latino of any race were 15.2% of the population.

According to the Providence Plan, a local nonprofit aimed at improving city life, 47% of residents are white, 32.1% Hispanic, and 14.8% are African-American. These are all slightly above the citywide averages. Nearly 50% of public school children speak a language other than English as their primary language.

The median family income is $27,288, below the citywide average of $32,058. 28% of families live below the poverty line with 10% of residents receiving some form of public assistance.

One in four children has been exposed to unsafe levels of lead.

Government

Nearly all of Federal Hill is within Ward 13, which is represented in the Providence City Council by Democrat Rachel Miller. A small portion of Federal Hill is in Ward 15, represented by Democrat Oscar Vargas.

The Providence Public Safety Complex is located on Federal Hill at 325 Washington Street. The complex is the headquarters of the Providence Police Department, the Providence Fire Department and the city's municipal courts. The building was dedicated in 2002 by former Mayor Vincent Cianci Jr. The courts and particularly Judge Frank Caprio have been made famous locally by the television show Caught in Providence, which documents the proceedings of the municipal court.

Parks

Federal Hill includes three green spaces along Atwells Avenue:

 Garibaldi Square is a half-acre square featuring a monumental bust of Giuseppe Garibaldi.
 DePasquale Plaza is a plaza used for outdoor dining.
 St. John's Park is a small park at the former location of St John's Church.

Another large green space is Franciscan Park (or Bell Street Dog Park), a two and a half acre dog park, located off Broadway near Route 6.

Also, the Spruce Street Bocce Courts on the northwest corner of Spruce and Dean streets has benches and two lighted bocce courts and serves as the home of several local bocce leagues, the largest being the popular Nocabulabet Bocce League which hosts games on Wednesday nights during its spring and fall seasons.

Culinary reputation

Federal Hill is often characterized by its culinary reputation. Atwells Avenue has over twenty restaurants within a quarter mile section, such as Angelo's Civita Farnese.  The area's proximity to Johnson and Wales University has allowed Providence to attract and retain skilled chefs, many of whom work in the many restaurants on Atwells Avenue.

In popular culture
Federal Hill plays a central role in the story "The Haunter of the Dark" by Providence-born writer H.P. Lovecraft. It is the site of a church which in the story was used by a sect called the Church of Starry Wisdom for their services, and houses the Shining Trapezohedron and the 'Haunter' itself - a creature summoned from time and space and said to be an avatar of Nyarlathotep. The church that figures prominently in the story was based on St. John's Church, an actual church on Atwells Avenue that was built in 1873 and demolished in 1992. It was, in Lovecraft's day, the principal Catholic church in the area. The description of the interior and belfry of the church is quite accurate.

References

External links

Federal Hill, Providence Commerce Association
 More can be read about the Irish period on the Hill at http://federalhillirish.com/

Ethnic enclaves in Rhode Island
Italian-American culture in Providence, Rhode Island
Little Italys in the United States
Neighborhoods in Providence, Rhode Island
1788 establishments in the United States
Federal Hill, Providence, Rhode Island